KIQK (104.1 FM) is a radio station broadcasting a country music format. Licensed to Rapid City, South Dakota, United States, the station serves the Rapid City area.  The station is currently owned by Haugo Broadcasting, Inc.

History
The station went on the air as KTOQ-FM on 1989-11-29. On 1991-09-01, the station changed its call sign to KIQN, on 1991-10-07 to the current KIQK.

In 1998, Haugo Broadcasting (owner of KSQY) acquired Rapid City stations KIQK "Kick 104" and KTOQ "K-Talk 1340" from Tom-Tom Broadcasting, then owned by NBC news anchor Tom Brokaw. Soon after the purchase, KSQY moved its studios to Rapid City and joined its new sister stations. In Sept 2008, Haugo Broadcasting moved into its new facilities at 3601 Canyon Lake Drive.

References

External links

IQK